Polls leading up to the 1997 Canadian federal election.

National polls

Campaign period

During the 33rd Parliament of Canada

By geographic area

In the Atlantic provinces

In Québec

In Ontario

In the Prairies

In Alberta

In British Columbia

Notes

References

External links

1997 Canadian federal election
1997 general election
Canada